DXBC (92.7 FM), broadcasting as MOR 92.7 For Life!, was a radio station owned and operated by ABS-CBN Corporation. Its studio and transmitter were located at the ABS-CBN Complex, Quintilla St., Purok Malakas, Brgy. San Isidro, General Santos.

On May 5, 2020, the station, along with the other My Only Radio stations, went off the air due to the cease and desist order of the National Telecommunications Commission following the ABS-CBN franchise renewal controversy. It currently operates as an online platform.

References

External links

Radio stations in General Santos
Radio stations established in 1998
Radio stations disestablished in 2020
MOR Philippines stations
Defunct radio stations in the Philippines